PMDTA (N,N,N′,N′′,N′′-pentamethyldiethylenetriamine) is an organic compound with the formula [(CH3)2NCH2CH2]2NCH3. PMDTA is a basic, bulky, and flexible, tridentate ligand that is a used in organolithium chemistry.  It is a colorless liquid, although impure samples appear yellowish.

Synthesis
PMDTA is prepared from diethylenetriamine by the Eschweiler-Clarke reaction, involving the use of formaldehyde and formic acid.
(H2N[CH2]2)2NH + 5 CH2O + 5 HCO2H → (Me2N[CH2]2)2NMe + 5 CO2 + 5 H2O

Comparison with diethylenetriamine
Unlike diethylenetriamine, all three amines in PMDTA are tertiary. Both PMDTA and diethylenetriamine are tridentate ligands that form two five-membered chelate rings. The σ-donating properties of the amino groups of diethylenetriamine are greater than that of PMDTA in copper(II) complexes. Both ligands can coordinate metal complexes in arrangements where the three nitrogen centers are co-planar or mutually cis.

Organolithium compounds and PMDTA
PMDTA is used to modify the reactivity of organolithium compounds, which deaggregate in the presence of Lewis bases to enhance their reactivity.  Commonly, the ditertiary amine TMEDA is used in these applications; it binds to the lithium center as a bidentate ligand. PMDTA behaves analogously, but since it is tridentate, it binds more strongly to lithium.  In contrast to TMEDA, PMDTA forms monomeric complexes with organolithium compounds.  Both amines affect the regiochemistry of metalation.

In the PMDTA/n-BuLi adducts, the Li-C bonds are highly polarized, thus increasing the basicity of the butyl group.

The effect of PMDTA on lithium anilide is illustrative of PMDTA's complexing power. The complex, [{PhN(H)Li}3·2PMDTA], is trinuclear, featuring approximately colinear Li+ centers that are three-, four-, and five-coordinate. The central three-coordinate lithium atom is not bonded to PMDTA. One of the terminal Li centers is pseudo-tetrahedral in an N4 coordination sphere. The other terminal lithium atom is five-coordinate and binds to two anilino N centers and the PMDTA.

Transition metal and aluminium complexes
PMDTA often forms five-coordinate complexes due to steric bulk of the methyl groups. PMDTA stabilize unusual cations. The first cationic derivative of alane, [H2Al(PMDTA)]+[AlH4]− was prepared by treating H3AlNMe3 with PMDTA.

References

Ethyleneamines
Tertiary amines
Tridentate ligands